Rodinsky (masculine), Rodinskaya (feminine), or Rodinskoye (neuter) is the name of several rural localities in Russia:
Rodinsky, Republic of Bashkortostan, a village in Arkhangelsky District of the Republic of Bashkortostan
Rodinsky, Orenburg Oblast, a settlement in Sorochinsky District of Orenburg Oblast
Rodinskaya, a village in Zavolzhsky District of Ivanovo Oblast
Rodinskoye, a selo in Yelansky District of Volgograd Oblast